Video Gospel is a television series airing on Black Entertainment Television, featuring gospel music videos. It began airing during the 1989 season. It also aired from 2000-2005 and 2010-2011. It originally began airing as the companion series to Video Soul which aired on BET from 1981 to 1996.

External links

1989 American television series debuts
2011 American television series endings
1980s American music television series
1990s American music television series
2000s American music television series
2010s American music television series
BET original programming